Israel Post is the trading name of the Israel Postal Company, formerly called the Israel Postal Authority, which is a government-owned corporation that provides postal services in Israel.

Israel Post has 5,000 employees, including 1,650 mail delivery staff and 2,000 postal clerks manning 700 post office branches around the country. It has a network of 4,262 mail boxes and 1,000 mail trucks. Some 2.5 million postal items are sorted every day.

History
The Israel Postal Company has its roots in the postal system from the British Mandate period (1920-1948). In 1948, after the establishment of the State of Israel, the Ministry of Transportation was given responsibility for the provision of postal services in the country. In 1951, the Ministry of Postal Services was established, which later became the Ministry of Communications. Close to the British model, the services included delivery of letters, parcels, and telegrams, as well as telephone services. The Israeli Postal Bank opened in 1951. The Israel Postal Authority was created in 1986.

Postal services in Israel have historically operated at a loss. In 2002, the loss was NIS 150 million, and in 2003 it was NIS 200 million. In 2002, in the wake of these losses, political scandals and technological developments in communications, major reforms were implemented. A new government company, the Israel Postal Company Ltd., was founded and went into operation in March 2006. Since 2007, the financial situation has improved, and Israel Post is now making a small profit.

In June 2013, Israel Post signed an agreement to deploy the latest version of Escher’s Group Riposte retail software, a peer-to-peer network technology.

In October 2014, Israel Post announced that it would be laying off 1,200 employees and dropping mail delivery to twice a week. Additionally, several branches were closed, while hours of those branches which remained were extended, to reduce waiting times. In March 2015, Israel Post added the ability to make appointments online or via an app, in another effort to reduce waiting times.

Political appointments
Being a government authority, the Israeli Postal Authority was a fertile bed for political appointments - quoting judge Revivi's take: "From the unraveling of testimonies, a grim picture rises, of an authority, in which the phenomena of political appointments has spread under every minister's shift".

Improper function complaints
Public complaints over improper function of the Israel Postal Company have accumulated over the years. Such complaints were still on the rise during the last decade - in July 2015 the State Comptroller of Israel issued a report, stating that the highest rate of rightful complaints he received were issue against the Postal Company. 70% of complaints were found justified. As of 2019, the dissatisfaction of the public from the company's function seems to only be increasing - with State Comptroller of Israel issuing another harsh report - mentioning: "In recent years, the number of complaints filed with the Office has increased.  The Israel Postal Company is the audited body against which the highest percentage of justified complaints were filed: 74.2% in 2017, whereas the overall percentage of justified complaints for that year stood at 32.2%. It appears that this trend continued into 2018."

Israeli philately

In April 1948, the British discontinued all postal services. On Friday, 14 May 1948, Israel declared independence. On Sunday morning, the new state issued its first stamps. There was virtually no paper for printing stamps and no appropriate printing presses or perforating machines. Even the name of the country had not yet been finalized. Nevertheless, Doar Ivri ("Hebrew Post") stamps appeared immediately after the declaration of independence, and went on sale at postal branches throughout the country.

The Israel Philatelic Service was previously located on 137 Haganah Street in Tel-Aviv, but moved to 2 Pinsker Street in late 2019.

Letters to God
Every year, the Israel Postal Company receives thousands of letters from all over the world addressed to God. Rather than consider them dead letters, the letters are collected at the Givat Shaul central mail facility. Once a year, they are taken to the Old City and placed between the stones of the Western Wall in a festive ceremony. The post office also receives letters addressed to Jesus Christ, the Virgin Mary and King David, but only those addressed to God are sent to the Western Wall.

See also
Postage stamps and postal history of Israel
Postal codes in Israel

References

External links

  Official Website

Postal organizations
Communications in Israel
Government-owned companies of Israel
Organizations based in Jerusalem
1948 establishments in Israel